Walter G. May (November 28, 1918 – February 18, 2015) was an Canadian engineer who held a distinguished professorship at University of Illinois Urbana-Champaign.

Early life and education 
May was born in Saskatchewan. He earned a Bachelor of Science degree in chemical engineering and Master of Science in chemistry from the University of Saskatchewan. He later earned a PhD in chemical engineering from the Massachusetts Institute of Technology.

Career 
In 1943, May returned to the University of Saskatchewan as a professor of chemical engineering. He joined the Exxon Research and Engineering Company in 1948 and worked as a senior science advisor from 1978 to 1983.

May was elected to the American Institute of Chemical Engineers and National Academy of Engineering in recognition of his contributions to engineering theory and practice in fluidization, high-energy propellants, LNG technology, and centrifugal isotope separation.

References

Members of the United States National Academy of Engineering
University of Illinois faculty
American chemical engineers
2015 deaths
Canadian chemical engineers

Massachusetts Institute of Technology alumni
University of Saskatchewan alumni
Academic staff of the University of Saskatchewan
University of Illinois Urbana-Champaign faculty
ExxonMobil people
Canadian engineers